Noah Cato (born 31 March 1988) is an English rugby union player who plays as a wing and fullback for Wimbledon RFC in the National League 2 South.

He was educated at St. Aubyns School, Rottingdean, Hurstpierpoint College and at the University of Hertfordshire.

Club career
Cato made his full debut for Saracens against Leeds Carnegie during the 2007–08 season. He signed a new contract in January 2010.
On 5 April 2011 it was announced that Cato would be joining Northampton Saints for the 2011–12 season. Before he departed he was a replacement as Saracens won their first Premiership title. On 26 February 2013, he signed for Newcastle Falcons for the rest of the 2012–13 season, after leaving Northampton. However, he signed a permanent deal to stay with Newcastle from the 2013–14 season. His last game for Newcastle Falcons was on 28 March 2015 against London Irish. In 2017 he returned to rugby playing for Wimbledon in National 2 South, level 4.

International career
Cato represented England at the 2007 Under 19 Rugby World Championship. In May 2007 he made his debut for the England Sevens team at the London Sevens.

In 2008 he was a member of the England under-20 team that won the grand slam and reached the final of the 2008 IRB Junior World Championship.

In January 2009 Cato made his debut for the England Saxons against  and played at the 2009 Churchill Cup.

References

External links
Saracens profile
England profile

1988 births
Living people
English rugby union players
Saracens F.C. players
Rugby union wings
Black British sportspeople
People educated at Hurstpierpoint College
Alumni of the University of Hertfordshire
People educated at St. Aubyns School
Rugby union players from Brighton